Thomas McKnight (April 1868 – 1930) was an English soccer-player who played in the Association-Football-League for Aston Villa.

As a new signing for Villa, McKnight played in the benefit match  held for Small Heath player, Chris Charsley, ahead of his retirement; despite the admission charge being increased for the occasion, around 6,000 spectators turned up to watch a schoolboys' match followed by the main attraction. In an encounter described by the Birmingham Daily Post as "perhaps the closest and most exciting ever played on the field", Villa drew 2–2 with a Small Heath eleven. A substantial sum was raised.

References

1868 births
1930 deaths
English footballers
Aston Villa F.C. players
English Football League players
Association football forwards